Caruthers v Whitaker [1975] 2 NZLR 667 is a cited case in New Zealand regarding "subject to contract" clauses in conditional contracts.

References

Court of Appeal of New Zealand cases
New Zealand contract case law
1975 in New Zealand law
1975 in case law